"Graffiti" was the third single released by Maxïmo Park, taken from their first album A Certain Trigger. It was released on 2 May 2005, and reached number 15 on the UK Singles Chart.
The song was awarded 'Lyric of the year' on BBC 6 Music for lyrics written by guitarist Duncan Lloyd

Track listing
 CD1 (WAP187CD) (White Background) :
 "Graffiti" – 3:05
 "Trial and Error" – 2:29

 CD2 (WAP187CDR) (Green Background) :
 "Graffiti" (Original Demo Version) – 3:11
 "Stray Talk" – 2:47
 "Apply Some Pressure" (Original Demo Version) – 3:27

 7" (7WAP187, white vinyl):
 "Graffiti" – 3:05
 "Hammer Horror" – 3:31

External links
Single information on MaxïmoPark.com

2005 singles
Maxïmo Park songs
Songs written by Duncan Lloyd
Songs written by Paul Smith (rock vocalist)
Song recordings produced by Paul Epworth
2005 songs
Warp (record label) singles